Crypt Style is the second official album by the group The Jon Spencer Blues Explosion, and was first released in 1992 on CD in Japan on the "1+2" label.  It was later released with an abbreviated track listing on CD in Germany, and as an LP in the US, both in 1993 under the Crypt label.  The album tracks were recorded in two different sessions.  The first come from a recording session with Kramer in July 1991, and followed by a recording session with Steve Albini in November and December 1991.

Many of the tracks that appear on this album are the same ones that appear on both A Reverse Willie Horton Bootleg LP and The Jon Spencer Blues Explosion CD that was released in the US in 1992.  Because there are three versions of this album with different track listings, many people consider this release to be the same as the self-titled release, because all of the tracks are from the same two recording sessions.

Track listings

Japan CD - 1992 

 Lovin' Up A Storm
 Support-A-Man
 White Tail
 '78 Style
 Chicken Walk
 Mo' Chicken/Let's Get Funky
 Water Main
 Like A Hawk
 Big Headed Baby
 The Feeling Of Love
 Kill-A-Man
 Rachel
 History Of Sex
 Comeback
 Twentynine
 What To Do
 40 lb Block Of Cheese
 Write A Song
 I.E.V.
 Eye To Eye
 Eliza Jane
 Maynard Ave.
 Colty
 Intro A
 Biological

Germany CD - 1993 

 Lovin' Up a Storm - 1:45
 Support a Man - 2:01
 White Tail - 2:28
 Maynard Ave. - 1:55
 '78 Style - 1:27
 Chicken Walk - 2:53
 Mo' Chicken Let's Get Funky - 2:42
 Watermain - 1:15
 Like a Hawk - 2:27
 Big Headed Baby - 1:06
 Write a Song - 1:58
 Eye to Eye - 1:38
 The Feeling of Love - 1:52 (Different take than on Self-Titled album)
 Kill a Man - 1:52
 Rachel - 2:25
 History of Sex - 1:47
 Comeback - 3:10
 The Vacuum of Loneliness - 3:02

US LP - 1993 
Side A 

 Lovin' Up A Storm
 Support-A-Man
 White Tail
 '78 Style
 Chicken Walk
 Mo' Chicken/Let's Get Funky
 Water Main
 Like A Hawk
 Big Headed Baby
Side B 

 The Feeling Of Love
 Kill-A-Man
 Rachel
 History Of Sex
 Comeback
 Twentynine
 What To Do
 40 lb Block of Cheese

References 

1993 compilation albums
Jon Spencer Blues Explosion albums
Crypt Records albums